Poutrincourt Lake is a freshwater body of the unorganized territory of Lac-Ashuapmushuan, Quebec, in the western part of the Regional County Municipality (MRC) Le Domaine-du-Roy, in the administrative region of Saguenay-Lac-Saint-Jean, in province of Quebec, in Canada. This lake extends in the townships of Poutrincourt and Bouteroue. It is located west of the Ashuapmushuan Wildlife Reserve.

Forestry is the main economic activity of the sector. Recreational tourism activities come second.

The western part of the lake Poutrincourt hydrographic slope is accessible via the forest road R0223 (east-west direction) which passes to the north and a road branch on the east side of the lake. The forest road route 167 passes north-east of Nicabau Lake, connecting Chibougamau to Saint-Félicien, Quebec. The Canadian National Railway runs along this road.

The surface of Poutrincourt Lake is usually frozen from early November to mid-May, however, safe ice circulation is generally from mid-November to mid-April.

Geography

Toponymy
Formerly, according to various sources, this body of water was designated "Lake Ascatiche", "Lake Ascatscie", "Lake Askatiche", "Lake Askitichi", "Lake Scatsi" or "Lake Skatsi".

The ancient appellations lake Ascatiche, Askitichi, Scatsie or Ascatsie, reported in the Dictionary of Rivers and Lakes of the Province of Quebec (1914 and 1925) are deformations of the Innu expression "oskat assi" meaning "new earth", "where the wood is green" or "small raw skin" according to the authors. The toponym “Poutrincourt”, which appears on a map of the region of Chibougamau in 1934, is borrowed from the name of the township where it is and honors the memory of Jean de Biencourt de Poutrincourt and Saint-Just (1557-1615), a character intimately linked to the beginning of the colonization of Acadie in the 17th century.

With Sieur de Monts, among others, he spent the winter of 1604-1605 on Sainte-Croix Island at the mouth of the river of the same name, on the border separating New Brunswick from the State of Maine. In 1606, Poutrincourt returned to Acadia as lieutenant governor of the fledgling colony. He made several other stays in Port-Royal, notably in 1607, in 1610 and in 1614.

The toponym "Lac Poutrincourt" was made official on December 5, 1968 by the Commission de toponymie du Québec, ie when this commission was created.

Notes and references

See also 

Lakes of Saguenay–Lac-Saint-Jean
Le Domaine-du-Roy Regional County Municipality